Amazonia is a village in Lincoln Township, Andrew County, Missouri, United States. The population was 312 at the 2010 census. It is part of the St. Joseph, MO–KS Metropolitan Statistical Area.

History
Amazonia was laid out in 1857. A post office called Amazonia has been in operation since 1859. The origin of the name Amazonia is obscure.

Geography
Amazonia is located at  (39.888362, -94.892177).

Demographics

2010 census
As of the census of 2010, there were 312 people, 118 households, and 83 families residing in the village. The racial makeup of the village was 97.4% White, 0.3% African American, 1.0% Native American, 0.6% from other races, and 0.6% from two or more races. Hispanic or Latino of any race were 1.0% of the population.

There were 118 households, of which 33.9% had children under the age of 18 living with them, 54.2% were married couples living together, 9.3% had a female householder with no husband present, 6.8% had a male householder with no wife present, and 29.7% were non-families. 22.9% of all households were made up of individuals, and 11% had someone living alone who was 65 years of age or older. The average household size was 2.64 and the average family size was 3.06.

The median age in the village was 39.7 years. 25.6% of residents were under the age of 18; 7.4% were between the ages of 18 and 24; 24.7% were from 25 to 44; 29.7% were from 45 to 64; and 12.5% were 65 years of age or older. The gender makeup of the village was 51.0% male and 49.0% female.

2000 census
As of the census of 2000, there were 277 people, 106 households, and 83 families residing in the village. The population density was 785.1 people per square mile (305.6/km2). There were 114 housing units at an average density of 323.1 per square mile (125.8/km2). The racial makeup of the village was 99.28% White, 0.36% African American, and 0.36% from two or more races.

There were 106 households, out of which 34.9% had children under the age of 18 living with them, 63.2% were married couples living together, 11.3% had a female householder with no husband present, and 20.8% were non-families. 19.8% of all households were made up of individuals, and 7.5% had someone living alone who was 65 years of age or older. The average household size was 2.61 and the average family size was 2.96.

In the village, the population was spread out, with 25.6% under the age of 18, 9.0% from 18 to 24, 30.7% from 25 to 44, 23.1% from 45 to 64, and 11.6% who were 65 years of age or older. The median age was 35 years. For every 100 females, there were 100.7 males. For every 100 females age 18 and over, there were 102.0 males.

The median income for a household in the village was $36,250, and the median income for a family was $42,813. Males had a median income of $29,167 versus $14,444 for females. The per capita income for the village was $17,609. About 9.4% of families and 12.0% of the population were below the poverty line, including 16.2% of those under the age of eighteen and 23.8% of those 65 or over.

References

Villages in Andrew County, Missouri
St. Joseph, Missouri metropolitan area
Villages in Missouri